This is a list of Finance Ministers of Uttarakhand; which function as heads of the Indian state of Uttarakhand's Ministry of Finance and members of the Uttarakhand government's cabinet.

See also
 List of chief ministers of Uttarakhand
 Uttarakhand Council of Ministers

Finance Ministers